Ctenucha mennisata is a moth of the family Erebidae. It is found in Bolivia.

References

mennisata
Moths described in 1900